Panda Hotel, formerly Kowloon Panda Hotel, is a hotel in Tsuen Wan, New Territories, Hong Kong, located between MTR Tsuen Wan station and Tai Wo Hau station.

It is the largest hotel in Tsuen Wan District, with a total of 1,026 rooms. It is developed, owned and managed by Hopewell Holdings.

Panda Place
Panda Place is a shopping arcade inside the Panda Hotel. It occupies  at the second floor, ground floor and three basement levels beneath the hotel. It is also owned by Hopewell Holdings.

Panda Place was formerly the Japanese department store Yaohan's Tsuen Wan Branch. The site became vacant after Yaohan collapsed during the Asian Financial Crisis in 1997. In 2005, Hopewell redeveloped and renamed the premises.

References

External links

 

Hotel buildings completed in 1990
Hotels in Hong Kong
Hopewell Holdings
Tsuen Wan
Tsuen Wan District
Hotels established in 1990